GURPS Wild Cards is a sourcebook for GURPS, published in 1989.

Contents
GURPS Wild Cards is a campaign setting supplement for GURPS Supers, set in the world of the Wild Cards science-fiction series.

Publication history
GURPS Wild Cards was written by John J. Miller, with a cover by Neal McPheeters, and was published by Steve Jackson Games in 1989 as a 128-page book.

GURPS Wild Cards was one of the earliest licensed properties produced by Steve Jackson Games.

Reception
Mike Jarvis reviewed GURPS Wild Cards for Games International magazine, and gave it 3 stars out of 5, and stated that "while being a fine product in most respects, this book is marred by the feeling of incompletion which pervades the book".

John Sullivan reviewed GURPS Wild Cards in Space Gamer/Fantasy Gamer #88. Sullivan commented at the end of his review: "GURPS Wild Cards successfully addresses [the] ways to run a successful Supers campaign using the world of the Wild Cards. The world flavor is highly described and guidelines for adventures and play are given. For those of you who have been waiting to play in this world, now you can. However, this addresses one other problem with this worldbook; you need TWO other Steve Jackson Games products to play it, GURPS Basic and Supers. This is going to cause some players to take a hard look at Wild Cards; do they want to buy a GURPS worldbook to play a GURPS worldbook? If they want to play Wild Cards, then the answer is a resounding yes! If they are going to be using it as a separate world or a sourcebook for characters only, then the price is a little steep [...]; they would be better off to buy a villains book and an adventure supplement".

Rick Swan reviewed GURPS Wild Cards for Dragon magazine #178 (February 1992). He declared: "Recommended to super-hero fans in general and GURPS Supers game enthusiasts in particular, this exceptional supplement discusses the world of the Takisian wild card virus in fascinating detail, addressing many of the questions left unanswered in the Bantam Spectra novel series, such as exactly how the virus triggers human mutations, the history of the Shadow Fist Society, and the mysterious link between the Wild Cards phenomena and baseball. Game statistics and background dossiers are given for the Great and Powerful Turtle, Sewer Jack, and dozens of other memorable characters, along with useful suggestions for creating player-designed mutants. The section discussing actual role-playing is disappointingly skimpy. GMs are pretty much on their own when it comes to creating adventures, and the artwork is adequate at best. Otherwise, this is a terrific effort. Be forewarned that, like the novels, this supplement is not intended for children".

Game designer Shannon Appelcline considered GURPS Wild Cards an "ironic property" since it was a GURPS book based on a novel series that was originally based on a role-playing game campaign that had been played using Superworld.

Reviews
GURPS Wild Cards was also reviewed in Games Review Vol. 2 #4.

References

Alternate history role-playing games
Wild Cards
Role-playing game supplements introduced in 1989
Role-playing games based on novels
Superhero role-playing games
Wild Cards